Urodeta bucera is a moth of the family Elachistidae. It is found in the Democratic Republic of the Congo.

The wingspan is 5.1-5.8 mm. The forewings are strongly mottled with scales basally whitish and distally dark brown. The hindwings and fringes are grey brown. Adults have been recorded in March and late May.

Etymology
The species name is derived from the Latin bucerus (meaning ox-horned) and refers to the horn-shaped juxta lobes.

References

Elachistidae
Moths described in 2011
Insects of the Democratic Republic of the Congo
Moths of Africa
Endemic fauna of the Democratic Republic of the Congo